Don Larry Talbert (born March 1, 1939) is a former American football offensive tackle in the National Football League (NFL) for the Dallas Cowboys, Atlanta Falcons, and New Orleans Saints. He was drafted in the eighth round of the 1961 NFL Draft. He played college football at the University of Texas at Austin.

Early years
Talbert attended Texas City High School, where he practiced football and basketball. He accepted a football scholarship from the University of Texas at Austin, where he was a two-way tackle. He missed the 1958 season with a broken leg.

As a fifth year senior in 1961, he was named All-SWC, All-American and was voted outstanding SWC lineman in the Dallas Times Herald poll.

In 1992, he was inducted into the Longhorns Hall of Honor.

Professional career

Dallas Cowboys (first stint)
Talbert was selected by the Dallas Cowboys in the eighth round (100th overall) of the 1961 NFL Draft with a future draft pick, which allowed the team to draft him before his college eligibility was over. He was also selected by the Houston Oilers in the 34th round (271st overall) of the 1962 AFL Draft.

As a rookie in 1962, although he played as a defensive end and linebacker, he was mostly the backup at right offensive tackle and got a chance to start in 4 games.

Talbert was in the reserve officer program at Texas and had to miss the next 2 seasons because of military service in the Vietnam War, where he was a police lieutenant in Saigon. He returned to the team in 1965 and played in all 14 games as a backup.

Atlanta Falcons
The Atlanta Falcons selected him from the Cowboys roster in the 1966 NFL Expansion Draft. He was the franchise's first starter at left tackle. He was a three-year starter. On July 3, 1969, he was traded along with Errol Linden to the New Orleans Saints in exchange for offensive linemen Roy Schmidt, Jim Ferguson and Jerry Jones.

New Orleans Saints
Talbert was a two-year starter at left tackle with the New Orleans Saints. On August 2, 1971, he was traded to the Dallas Cowboys in exchange for defensive end Doug Moore and a fourth round draft choice (#104-Eric Allen).

Dallas Cowboys (third stint)
In 1971, he was a backup until replacing Ralph Neely in the starting lineup at left tackle in the eighth game, after he had a motorcycle accident. Talbert promptly sprained his ankle, he was first replaced with Forrest Gregg and later by Tony Liscio. He was able to be a part of the Super Bowl VI winning team.

He was waived on September 7, 1972 and later put on the future list, where he remained for the rest of the season. He was re-signed in 1973, but was waived on September 5 and placed on the team taxi squad, before being waived again on September 19.

Houston Texans/Shreveport Steamer (WFL)
Talbert was selected by the Chicago Fire in the sixth round (64th overall) of the 1974 WFL Pro Draft of NFL and CFL Players. He was signed by the Houston Texans. After playing 11 games, the team relocated to Shreveport, Louisiana on September 18, where they were renamed as the Shreveport Steamer.

Personal life
His younger brother Diron Talbert played defensive tackle in the NFL for the Los Angeles Rams and Washington Redskins.

References

1939 births
Living people
People from Texas City, Texas
Players of American football from Texas
Sportspeople from the Houston metropolitan area
American football offensive tackles
Texas Longhorns football players
Dallas Cowboys players
Atlanta Falcons players
New Orleans Saints players
United States Army personnel of the Vietnam War
United States Army officers
Military personnel from Texas